This is a list of gothic cathedrals in Europe that are active Christian cathedrals (the seats of bishops), but also includes former cathedrals and churches built in the style of cathedrals, that are significant for their Gothic style of architecture.  As such, some of the buildings listed here are parish churches or have other uses.

Gothic cathedrals in Europe

See also
Gothic cathedrals and churches
List of cathedrals
List of basilicas
European Route of Brick Gothic

References

Sources
 List of Cathedrals by GCatholic.org
 Catholic Hierarchy

Cathedral architecture
Cathedrals